Elkhorn Mountain, is a mountain in Clark County, Washington. It rises northeast of Vancouver, Washington.

References

Mountains of Clark County, Washington
Mountains of Washington (state)
Cascade Range